John Francis Perko (April 8, 1918 – June 7, 1984) was an American football offensive guard who played one season for the Buffalo Bisons of the AAFC. He also served in the U.S. Marine Corps. He died in 1984 at the age of 66.

References

1918 births
1984 deaths
Players of American football from Minnesota
American football offensive guards
People from Ely, Minnesota
Notre Dame Fighting Irish football players
Minnesota Golden Gophers football players
Buffalo Bisons (AAFC) players
United States Marine Corps personnel of World War II